The 2019 Darlington Borough Council election took place on 2 May 2019 to elect members of the Darlington Borough Council in England. It was held on the same day as other local elections.

Summary

Election resut

|-

Ward results

Bank Top & Lascelles

Brinkburn & Faverdale

Cockerton

College

Eastbourne

Harrowgate Hill

Haughton & Springfield

Heighington & Coniscliffe

Hummersknott

Hurworth

Mowden

North Road

Northgate

Park East

Park West

Pierremont

Red Hall & Lingfield

Sadberge & Middleton St. George

Stephenson

Whinfield

By-elections

Hummersknott

References

2019 English local elections
May 2019 events in the United Kingdom
2019
2010s in County Durham